Andy Stefanovich (born 1966) is an American speaker, bestselling author, and business consultant. A native of Detroit, Michigan, Stefanovich is currently the founding partner of a consulting firm called Life. Previously, he was a partner with Richmond, Virginia-based venture capital firm New Richmond Ventures LLC. Before that, Stefanovich was "chief curator and provocateur" at Prophet, a global business and creative consulting firm headquartered in San Francisco.

Early career and Prophet
Stefanovich graduated from Miami University in Ohio. In 1990, he founded Opus Event Marketing after having worked in the sales department of Ritz-Carlton. The company originally focused on event planning for corporations, but eventually shifted into a creative marketing firm focusing on product development, branding, and positioning; working with organizations and businesses such as Colgate-Palmolive, American Express, Calvin Klein, Disney, Oscar Mayer and the U.S. Olympic Committee. In 1999, the company was renamed Play, and Stefanovich remained as founder.

Play was acquired in 2009 by Prophet, where Stefanovich was named senior partner. As part of the acquisition, Play's Richmond location became part of the Prophet network of offices. Stefanovich regularly speaks at corporations such as Coca-Cola, Disney, General Electric, and Procter & Gamble.

Local ventures & activism
In 2011, Stefanovich co-founded a venture capital firm called New Richmond Ventures (NRV) with three other prominent Richmond businessmen: Bob Mooney, Jim Ukrop, and Theodore Chandler Jr. NRV has a focus on local and "social impact" and has made early-stage investments in a number of companies including MedCPU, PlanG, and Plugless Power. In addition to NRV, Stefanovich co-founded a second local incubator in 2012 called Men in Shirts that invests in 3 or 4 companies each year in the $50–$150,000 range. Their investments include Richmond-based men's shirtmakers, Ledbury, and a brewery named Ardent Craft Ales. In addition to capital, Stefanovich provides "marketing and strategy advice." In 2013, Stefanovich curated Richmond's first TEDx event—called TEDxRVA—around the theme "CREATE".

Speaker and author
Stefanovich is a frequent guest on CNBC, where he talks about innovation and thought leadership, and Fast Company. Stefanovich is also a visiting professor and guest lecturer at universities including Yale University, the Wharton School of the University of Pennsylvania, Duke University, and Dartmouth College. He has delivered several TEDx speeches, including for NASA, London Business School, and TEDxYouth.

In 2011, Jossey-Bass, an imprint of Wiley Publishing published Stefanovich's first book Look at More: A Proven Approach to Innovation, Growth, and Change. Look at More was an Inc. bestseller and named one of Ad Age's "Ten Marketing Books You Should Have Read" in 2011.

References

External links
Andy Stefanovich on Twitter

1966 births
Living people
American business theorists
American business writers
American marketing people
American people of Serbian descent
Advertising theorists
Branding consultants